Latha, also known as M.G.R. Latha or Latha Sethupathi, is an Indian actress, who played leading roles in South Indian films from 1973 to 1983. She is also known for her roles in various serials in Tamil language.

Early life
Her photogenic looks and dancing skills attracted attention from the Tamil film industry. She entered films when she was fifteen and was encouraged by her aunt, actress Kamala Kotnis.  Her first film was Ulagam Sutrum Valiban (1973), whose star and producer was M. G. Ramachandran. She is from the Sethupathy clan, the Royal family of Ramnad, and her father was Shanmugha Rajeswara Sethupathi and her mother is Leelarani, originally from Kurnool, Andhra Pradesh, so Latha was fluent in Tamil and Telugu from an early age. The name Latha was given by MGR himself. Actor Rajkumar Sethupathy is her brother.

Career
Latha became a very successful actress and has won several awards. She has acted in more than one hundred films, spanning Tamil, Telugu and Malayalam. Her first film was Ulagam Sutrum Valiban (1973), in which she starred alongside M. G. Ramachandran.  It  was shot exclusively in foreign locations such as Thailand, Singapore, Malaysia, Hong Kong and Japan. The film's success skyrocketed her to the top of the industry and she was felicitated by the press for being the best and most glamorous amongst all the four actresses in the film. She remained M. G. Ramachandran's leading lady for several years in Tamil films.  He recommended her to star with Akkineni Nageswara Rao for Andala Ramudu (1973), thus making her debut in Telugu films. She specialized in playing glamorous roles in Tamil and Telugu films. She played Zeenat Aman's role in two remakes of Yaadon Ki Baaraat (1973): the Telugu film Annadammula Anubandham(1975) and the Tamil film Naalai Namathay (1975). She played Jaya Bhaduri's role from Zanjeer (1973 film) in the Telugu remake Nippulanti Manishi (1974) and the Tamil remake Sirithu Vazha Vendum (1974). She won a Filmfare Award for her performance in Vattathukkul Sadhuram. The Kalaimamani award was bestowed upon her by the State Government of Tamil Nadu for her achievements in the film industry. She has also received awards from the Government of Tamil Nadu as well as the Government of Andhra Pradesh for her acting ability. She was also briefly involved in politics, as her father, Shanmugha Rajeswara Sethupathi, the Raja of Ramnad, was once a politician. She played a vital role in Rajinikanth's movie Shankar Salim Simon. This role made her one of the only 2 actresses, along with Lakshmi, to be paired with MGR and Rajinikanth in the 1970s Tamil movies.

After a hiatus of 14 years, she successfully reprised her career by acting in leading roles in many mega-serials in Tamil and Telugu. In 2002, the actress played vicious mothers-in-law in the Telugu television serials Eenati Ramayanam, Pavithrabandham and Matti Manishi. Most recently, she has gained much notoriety alongside Raadhika in the Tamil television serials Chitthi, Kasthuri, Selvi and most famously in Arasi. Her role in Arase is very popular amongst the demographic of Tamils that religiously follow  mega serials, namely housewives and children. Her role is best known for her catchphrases "Pada Pada Padannu Irukkiradhu" and "Idhu Rombo Too Much" and the humorous portrayal of the character. Currently she is acting in the serials Roja as Canada Kamakshi and Sundari Neeyum Sundaran Naanum as Vijayalakshmi.

Notable filmography

Television
Serials

Shows

Personal life
She is married to Sabapathy, a Singapore businessman in 1983 and has 2 sons Karthik and Sreenivas.

References

External links
 

Indian film actresses
Living people
Tamil Nadu State Film Awards winners
Filmfare Awards South winners
Actresses in Tamil cinema
Actresses in Telugu cinema
Actresses in Kannada cinema
Actresses in Malayalam cinema
Actresses in Tamil television
Actresses in Telugu television
Year of birth missing (living people)